The sixth season of the talent show The Voice of Greece premiered on September 29, 2019 on Skai TV and Sigma TV.

The coaches were Helena Paparizou, Sakis Rouvas and Panos Mouzourakis returned for their fourth season as coaches, and with Eleonora Zouganeli as the new coach, replacing Kostis Maraveyas. Giorgos Lianos was the new host, replacing Giorgos Kapoutzidis. Christina Bompa was coming to serving as the new backstage and social networking corresponding, replacing Laura Narjes.

Dimitris Karagiannis was named the winner of the season on December 22, 2019; and Sakis Rouvas first win as a coach on The Voice of Greece.

Coaches and hosts
On August 19, 2019, Giorgos Kapoutzidis announced on his Instagram that after 3 seasons he will not be hosting the show. On September 7, 2019, Kostis Maraveyas announced that he will not be anymore coach on The Voice of Greece. On September 23, 2019, Laura Narjes announced that after 2 seasons she will not be the Backstage host. Several celebrities were rumored to be part of The Voice of Greece as coaches or hosts. On September 19, 2019, was announced that the fourth coach will be the singer Eleonora Zouganeli, replacing Maraveyas. On September 21, 2019, was announced that Giorgos Lianos and Christina Bompa will be the hosts, replacing Kapoutzidis and Narjes.

Teams
Color key

Blind auditions
The episodes began airing on September 27, 2019, being broadcast every Friday and Sunday on Skai TV and Sigma TV.

Color key

Episode 1 (September 27) 
The first blind audition episode was broadcast on September 27, 2019.

Episode 2 (September 29) 
The second blind audition episode was broadcast on September 29, 2019.

Episode 3 (October 4) 
The third blind audition episode was broadcast on October 4, 2019.

Episode 4 (October 6) 
The fourth blind audition episode was broadcast on October 6, 2019.

Episode 5 (October 11) 
The fifth blind audition episode was broadcast on October 11, 2019.

Episode 6 (October 13) 
The sixth blind audition episode was broadcast on October 13, 2019.

Episode 7 (October 18) 
The seventh blind audition episode was broadcast on October 18, 2019.

Episode 8 (October 20) 
The eighth blind audition episode was broadcast on October 20, 2019.

Episode 9 (October 25) 
The ninth blind audition episode was broadcast on October 25, 2019.

Episode 10 (October 27) 
The tenth blind audition episode was broadcast on October 27, 2019.

Episode 11 (November 1) 
The eleventh blind audition episode was broadcast on November 1, 2019.

Episode 12 (November 3) 
The twelfth blind audition episode was broadcast on November 3, 2019.

Episode 13 (November 8) 
The thirteenth blind audition episode was broadcast on November 8, 2019.

Episode 14 (November 10) 
The fourteenth and final blind audition episode was broadcast on November 10, 2019.

Knockouts
The Knockouts started on November 15, 2019. The coaches can each steal two losing artists from another team. Contestants who win their knockout or are stolen by another coach will advance to the Battles.

Colour key

The Battles
The Battles started on November 29, 2019. The coaches can each steal two losing artists from another team. Contestants who win their battle or are stolen by another coach will advance to the Live Shows.

Colour key

Live shows

Elimination chart 
Color key
Artist's info

Result details

Live show details
The live shows take place in the Galatsi Olympic Hall in Galatsi, Attica.
Color key

Week 1

Cross Battle 1 (December 6)

Cross Battle 2 (December 8)

Week 2

Semi-Final 1 (December 13)

Semi-Final 2 (December 15)

Week 3

Final (December 22)

Ratings

References

External links
 

Season 6
Voice of Greece 2019